Paano na Kaya is a 2010 Filipino romance film directed by Ruel S. Bayani and starring Kim Chiu and Gerald Anderson. The film was released by Star Cinema.

The film also had international screenings in San Francisco, Los Angeles, San Diego, Seattle, Jersey City, Honolulu, Chicago, Las Vegas, Guam and many other cities around the world. The film is now available in DVD and VCD worldwide via ABS-CBN International's Starry Starry Store.

Cast
Kim Chiu as Mae Chua
Gerald Anderson as Bogs Marasigan
Melissa Ricks as Anna
Ricky Davao as Roger Chua
Rio Locsin as Tessie Chua
Jon Avila as Anton
Robi Domingo as JC
Lloyd Samartino as Alvin
Bart Guingona as Uncle Rick
Janus Del Prado as Andoy
Empoy Marquez as Kwek-Kwek
Soliman Cruz as Mr. Castillo
Guji Lorenzana as Louie
Cai Cortez as Jubis	
Timothy Chan as Miguel
Alwyn Uytingco as Gino
Malou Crisologo as Manang	
IC Mendoza as Juding
Zsa Zsa Padilla as Carmina Marasigan
Bernard Palanca as Julius
Rica Peralejo as Maan Chua

Reception
Paano Na Kaya is screened in cinemas nationwide. It was given a "B" rating by Cinema Evaluation Board (CEB) and rated GP (General Patronage) by the Movie and Television Review and Classification Board.

According to Star Cinema, the film's 3rd week gross is over 100 million plus nationwide.

References

External links
PNK Official's Website

2010 films
2010s Tagalog-language films
Star Cinema films
2010 romance films
Philippine romance films
2010s English-language films